The Legendary Saga of St. Olaf or Helgisaga Óláfs konungs Haraldssonar is one of the kings' sagas, a 13th-century biography of the 11th-century Saint Olaf II of Norway. It is based heavily on the largely lost Oldest Saga of St. Olaf. The composition is primitive and clumsy and the saga essentially consists of a series of separate anecdotes extracted from skaldic verse. The anonymous author may have been a Norwegian and the saga is preserved in one mid-13th-century Norwegian  manuscript. It is thought to have been composed in the early 13th century. Snorri Sturluson is believed to have used a work closely similar to the Legendary Saga when he composed his Separate Saga of St. Olaf and  Heimskringla.

See also
The Saint Olav Drama

Notes

References

 Andersson, Theodore Murdock (2006). The Growth of the Medieval Icelandic Sagas, 1180-1280. Cornell University Press.  
 Bjarni Aðalbjarnarson (editor) (1941). Íslenzk fornrit XXVI : Heimskringla I. Hið íslenzka fornritafélag.
 Finlay, Alison (editor and translator) (2004). Fagrskinna, a Catalogue of the Kings of Norway. Brill Academic Publishers.  
 Hoops, Johannes (1999). Reallexikon der germanischen Altertumskunde: Band 14. Walter de Gruyter.

External links
 Olafs saga hins helga An 1849 edition of the Old Norse text.

Kings' sagas
Olaf II of Norway
Sagas of saints